9th Ward Pickin Parlor is a 2006 studio album by American rock singer-songwriter Shawn Mullins, recorded in Atlanta and in New Orleans Ninth Ward before Hurricane Katrina. Singles include "Beautiful Wreck" and "Find Love."

Track listing
"Blue As You"
"Beautiful Wreck"
"Cold Black Heart"
"Faith"
"Homemade Wine"
"Talkin' Goin' to Alaska Blues"
"We Could Go and Start Again"
"Kelly's Song"
"Find Love"
"All Fall Down"
"Lay Down Your Swords, Boys"
"Solitaire"
"House of the Rising Sun"

References 

2006 albums
Shawn Mullins albums
Vanguard Records albums